The Gumelniţa–Kodžadermen-Karanovo VI complex was a Chalcolithic cultural complex of the fifth millennium BC located in the eastern Balkans, comprising the Gumelnița, Kodžadermen and Karanovo cultures. It is also aggregated with the Varna culture. It formed part of the broader cultural complex known as Old Europe. Gumelniţa–Kodžadermen-Karanovo VI evolved out of the earlier Boian culture and phase V of the Karanovo culture. From c. 4000 BC Gumelniţa–Kodžadermen-Karanovo VI was replaced by the Cernavodă culture.

Danube script
During the Middle Copper Age, the Danube script appears in three horizons: The Gumelniţa–Kodžadermen-Karanovo VI cultural complex (mainly in Bulgaria, but also in Romania), the Cucuteni A3-A4–Trypillya B (in Ukraine), and Coțofeni I (in Serbia). The first, rates 68.6% of the frequencies; the second, rates 24.2%; and the third, rates 7.6%.

See also
Old Europe
Vinča culture
Tărtăria tablets
Vinča symbols
Sesklo culture
Cucuteni–Trypillia culture
Hamangia culture
Butmir Culture
Tisza culture
Linear Pottery culture
Lengyel culture
Funnelbeaker culture

References

Bibliography
Stefan Hiller, Vassil Nikolov (eds.), Karanovo III. Beiträge zum Neolithikum in Südosteuropa Österreichisch-Bulgarische Ausgrabungen und Forschungen in Karanovo, Band III, Vienna (2000), .

External links

Gumelnița culture museum
Brukenthalmuseum.ro
Civa.uv.ro
Civa.uv.ro
Bulgariatravel.org
Worldmuseumofman.org
Culture.gouv.fr
Cimec.ro
Cimec.ro
Arheologie.ulbsibiu.ro
 
Institute for the Study of the Ancient World

Archaeological cultures of Southeastern Europe
Neolithic cultures of Europe
Archaeological cultures in Bulgaria
Archaeological cultures in Greece
Archaeological cultures in Moldova
Archaeological cultures in Romania
5th millennium BC